Newburg is an unincorporated community in Charles County, Maryland, United States.     Newburg has two stores, a lodge hall, and a fire department, as well as Piccowaxen Middle School and Dr. Thomas L. Higdon Elementary, both serving the entire Cobb Neck peninsula (i.e. all along MD 257 to Cobb Island). Newburg also is the northbound terminus of the Harry Nice Memorial Bridge serving U.S. Route 301.

Notable people
 Danny Gatton, guitarist
 Charles Lollar, Republican politician
Allyn Rose, American beauty pageant titleholder and activist

References

Unincorporated communities in Charles County, Maryland
Unincorporated communities in Maryland